Walter Horace Kofi-Sackey was a Ghanaian lawyer and a politician and also a member of the first parliament of the second Republic representing the Bantama Constituency in the Ashanti Region of Ghana. He was a solicitor and Ministerial Secretary (deputy minister) for Works in the Busia government.

Early life and education
Kofi-Sackey was born on 2 September 1932. He was educated at the Accra Academy from 1947 to 1950. He proceeded to Achimota College from 1950 to 1952 for his sixth form education. He continued at the London School of Economics, a constituent college of the University of London from 1954 to 1957.

Career and politics
Kofi-Sackey was called to the bar at Lincoln's Inn on 24 June 1958 and the Ghana bar on 24 July 1958. He entered private legal practice that same year. He practised in Kumasi. He was a member of the Ashanti Bar Association (the Ashanti Regional branch of the Ghana Bar Association) and also became president of the association.

In 1969, he was elected as a member of parliament for Bantama a constituency in the Ashanti Region of Ghana on the ticket of the Progress Party. He contested with Bonsu Osei-Tutu of the National Alliance of Liberals and Samuel Kwabena Danso of the United Nationalist Party. That same year he was appointed deputy minister for Works. He served in that position until 1972 when the Busia government was over thrown. As was the norm of every military government that inherited power through a coup d'état, he and other top officials of the then erstwhile Progress Party were arrested without trial and detained for fifteen months. A ban was formally placed on all political parties and political activities on 16 January 1972, three days after the coup d'état. A committee was set up to investigate the assets of top officials of the party of which he was included on 9 February 1972. The adverse findings levelled against him and other party members by the committee were revoked by a review tribunal in 1979. He and some members of the party namely; Haruna Esseku, Bukari Adama and Alhaji Bukari consequently filed petitions against the adverse findings of the committee which was in turn dismissed by the tribunal.

Personal life
Kofi-Sackey married Valerie née Lindoe in 1957. She was head of the Castle Information Bureau  during the Provisional National Defence Council era. Valerie Sackey was a teacher at Opoku Ware School; and also an officer with the Department of Game and Wildlife. Together they had three children; Michael, Joseph and Anne.

See also
 List of MPs elected in the 1969 Ghanaian parliamentary election
 Busia government

References

1932 births
Date of death unknown
Place of death unknown
Akan people
20th-century Ghanaian lawyers
Ghanaian MPs 1969–1972
Alumni of the Accra Academy
Alumni of Achimota School
Alumni of the London School of Economics
Alumni of the University of London
Members of Lincoln's Inn
Alumni of the Inns of Court School of Law
Progress Party (Ghana) politicians
20th-century Ghanaian politicians
People from Ashanti Region